Charles Benjamin Howard (27 September 1885 – 25 March 1964) was a Liberal party member of the House of Commons of Canada. He was born in Smith's Mills, Quebec in Stanstead County and became a businessman, industrialist and lumber merchant.

Howard attended high school at Sherbrooke then Stanstead Wesleyan College. In 1923, he assumed the presidency of his family's lumber operation, B.C. Howard Company, following his father's death. In 1950 and 1951, Howard was mayor of Sherbrooke.

He was first elected to Parliament at the Sherbrooke riding in the 1925 general election then re-elected in 1926, 1930 and 1935. After completing his term in the 18th Canadian Parliament, Howard left the House of Commons and was appointed to the Senate for the Wellington, Quebec division.

On 25 March 1964, Howard died at his Sherbrooke residence shortly after completing a visit to Mexico. He remained a Senator at that time.

References

External links
 

1885 births
1964 deaths
Canadian senators from Quebec
Liberal Party of Canada MPs
Liberal Party of Canada senators
Mayors of Sherbrooke
Members of the House of Commons of Canada from Quebec
People from Estrie
Anglophone Quebec people